Königsberg marzipan is a type of marzipan traditionally produced in the former German city of Königsberg (now Kaliningrad, Russia). Königsberg's first marzipan production was established by the Pomatti brothers in 1809, who became confectioners of the Royal Prussian Court. They were joined by Sterkau, Petschliess, Liedtke, Siegel, Steiner, Gehlhaar, Plouda in Kneiphof, as well as Wald in Berlin and Schwermer in Bad Wörishofen.  Königsberg marzipan is known for its flamed surface, which results in a golden-brown finish. It contains rose water and is often filled with jam. These characteristics distinguish it from the more common Lübeck Marzipan, which also frequently comes in more elaborate forms.

Producers
After World War II Königsberg became part of the Soviet Union under the Potsdam Agreement. Most Germans fled or were expelled. The traditional production of Marzipan in Königsberg thus ceased to exist; the style was kept alive by confectioners such as Gehlhaar, a confectioner and candy shop located in Wiesbaden, Germany. Their products include marzipan candies. The business was established in 1912.  Along with Schwermer, Gehlhaar was one of the two largest marzipan producers in Königsberg in the early 20th century.

References

External links
Gehlhaar Marzipan

German confectionery
Königsberg
Marzipan